The National Environmental Information Exchange Network is a partnership among States, Territories, Tribes, and the United States Environmental Protection Agency that is revolutionizing the exchange of environmental information. Partners on the Exchange Network share data efficiently and securely over the Internet. This new approach is providing real-time access to higher quality data while saving time, resources, and money for partner states, tribes, and territories.

The Exchange Network is a secure Internet- and standards-based approach for exchanging environmental data and improving environmental decisions. The U.S. Environmental Protection Agency, States, Territories, and Tribes have built the Exchange Network to increase access to environmental data and make the exchange of data more efficient.

National Meeting
EN2015

References

External links
National Environmental Information Exchange Network

American environmental websites
Environmental data
Metadata registry
United States Environmental Protection Agency